Braddock may refer to:

Places

England, United Kingdom
 Braddock, Cornwall
 Battle of Braddock Down, 1643

Canada
 Braddock, Saskatchewan
 Braddock Lake, Saskatchewan; a reservoir

United States
 Braddock, New Jersey
 Braddock, North Dakota
 Braddock, Pennsylvania
 Braddock, Virginia
 Braddock Bay in Lake Ontario, northwest of Rochester, New York
 Braddock Heights, Maryland, a census-designated place
 Braddock Hills, Pennsylvania, a borough
 Braddock Mountain, local name for Catoctin Mountain near Frederick, Maryland
 Braddock Peak, Jackson County, Colorado
 Lake Braddock, Burke, Fairfax County, Virginia, a reservoir
 Braddock Point and Braddock Cove on the southern tip of Hilton Head Island, South Carolina
 Braddock's Field (battlefield) Braddock, Pennsylvania
 Mount Braddock, Pennsylvania

Facilities
 Braddock Point Light, a lighthouse west of Braddock Bay in New York
 Braddock Locks & Dam on the Monongahela River in Pennsylvania
 G. Holmes Braddock High School, Miami, Florida
 Lake Braddock Secondary School, Burke, Virginia 
 WMHS Braddock Campus (Cumberland, Maryland), also known as Braddock Hospital
 UPMC Braddock (Braddock, Pennsylvania), a hospital
 Braddock Hotel, NYC, NY, USA

People
Braddock (surname)

Middlename or nickname
Lemuel Braddock Schofield, Attorney at law
Rosemarie Braddock DeWitt, an American actress
 W. Braddock Hickman, president of the Federal Reserve Bank of Cleveland from 1963 to 1970
John Braddock Clontz, is a former relief pitcher in Major League Baseball from –.
Anderson "Braddock" Silva, Brazilian heavyweight kickboxer
Micky Dolenz, early career name of Mickey Braddock,  actor from Circus Boy series 1956-1964

In fiction

1900-1950
The Circus Man, a 1914 silent film produced by Jesse Lasky and distributed by Paramount Pictures.
Thomas Braddock, played by Theodore Roberts
Mary Braddock, played by Mabel Van Buren
Christine Braddock, played by Florence Dagmar
Marion Braddock, played by Toby Wing in the Silks and Saddles (1936 film)
Tommy Braddock, played by Russell Hardie in the Killer at Large (1936 film)
Celia Braddock, played by Jennifer Jones in the New Frontier (film) 1939

1950-2000
Capt. John Braddock, played by Reed Hadley in Racket Squad 1951
Matt Braddock, Fictional chartactor in The Rover (story paper) 1952
Benjamin Braddock, name of Dustin Hoffman's character in the 1967 movie "The Graduate" directed by Mike Nichols, based on the 1963 novel The Graduate (novel) by Charles Webb (author)
Charlie Braddock, Played by David Hemmings in the Juggernaut (1974 film)
Capt. Jack Braddock, the main character played by Warren Oates in the 1983 Blue Thunder film.
Colonel James Braddock, main character played by Chuck Norris on the 1980s "Missing in Action" film trilogy: Missing in Action, Missing in Action 2: The Beginning, and Braddock: Missing in Action III
Marvel Comics Universe
 Brian Braddock, formerly known as Captain Britain. 1976
 Elizabeth "Betsy" Braddock formerly known as Psylocke and currently known as Captain Britain, Brian's twin sister. 1976
 Jamie Braddock, fictional character in Marvel Comics 1976
 William "Billy" Braddock, Spider-UK 2014

2000-present
Annie Braddock, played by Scarlett Johansson in The Nanny Diaries (film) 2007
Craig Braddock, Played by Mark Camacho in the film Infected (2008 film)
Allen Braddock, Played by Kelsey Grammer in the Partners (2014 TV series) (10 episodes)

Other uses
Braddock (1968 film), a TV movie about a futuristic private eye Braddock played by Tom Simcox aired as part of the Premiere (TV series)
Braddock Expedition of the French and Indian War, ending in Edward Braddock's Defeat
Battle of Braddock Down, 1643 England
Braddock Dunn & McDonald, technical services firm
Braddock: Missing in Action III (1988 film) Chuck Norris film
Operation Braddock, a secret service measure during World War II

See also
Lake Braddock Secondary School, Burke, Virginia, USA
Braddock Road (disambiguation)